Halland County or Region Halland held a regional council election on 9 September 2018, the same day as the general and municipal elections.

Results
The number of seats remained at 71 with the Social Democrats winning the most at 19, a drop of four from in 2014.

Municipal results

Images

References

Elections in Halland County
Halland